Darna is the first film featuring the Pilipino Komiks character Darna. The film was released on May 31, 1951, by Royal Films. It was directed by Fernando Poe Sr. and written by Mars Ravelo, the creator of Darna.

Cast
Rosa del Rosario as Darna
Mila Nimfa as Narda
Cristina Aragon as Valentina
Manuel Ubaldo as Ding
Elena Mayo
Ben Perez
Leonora Ruiz

References

External links

1951 films
Darna
Films based on Philippine comics
Live-action films based on comics
Philippine films based on comics
Philippine superhero films
Philippine science fiction action films
Philippine science fantasy films
Superheroine films
Tagalog-language films
Philippine black-and-white films